The Football Association of Iceland (KSÍ) is the governing body of football in Iceland. It was founded on 26 March 1947, joined FIFA the same year, and UEFA in 1954. It organises the football league, Úrvalsdeild, and the Iceland men's national football team and Iceland women's national football team. It is based in Reykjavík.

Presidents
 Agnar K. Jónsson (1947–1948)
 Jón Sigurðsson (1948–1952)
 Sigurjón Jónsson (1952–1954)
 Björgvin Schram (1954–1968)
 Albert Guðmundsson (1968–1973)
 Ellert B. Schram (1973–1989)
 Eggert Magnússon (1989–2007)
 Geir Þorsteinsson (2007–2017)
 Guðni Bergsson (2017–2021)
 Vanda Sigurgeirsdóttir (2021–present)

National teams
Iceland men's national under-17 football team
Iceland men's national under-19 football team
Iceland men's national under-21 football team
Iceland men's national football team
Iceland women's national football team
Iceland national futsal team

2021 scandals
In 2021, The Football Association of Iceland was shaken by serious scandals. On August 13, an article titled "On KSÍ and Misogyny" appeared on the Icelandic newsweb Vísir.is, written by activist Hanna Björg Vilhjálmsdóttir, stating that representatives of the Association had actively suppressed news of a gang rape where the perpetrators had been two well-known Icelandic professional footballers.  Four days later, a declaration from KSÍ appeared in the media, claiming that the Association had never attempted to silence or suppress cases of violence and assaults. Vilhjálmsdóttir's article was repudiated as "insinuations" ("dylgjur").  On August 26, Guðni Bergsson, president of KSÍ was interviewed on RÚV, Iceland's national TV, and claimed that the Association totally disapproved of any kind of violence, sexual or other. Additionally, Guðni stated that The Football Association had never received any formal notifications of violence by professional footballers.  The following day, Guðni was contradicted by Þórhildur Gyða Arnarsdóttir, an Icelandic woman in her mid-twenties, who had been sexually assaulted by a member of the Icelandic Football Team in 2017. Þórhildur reported the crime to the police, but no action was taken. Six months later, Þórhildur's father realised that his daughter's aggressor had been recruited on the national team for an upcoming match. He consequently reported the incident to the Football Association and received the reply that action would be taken. However, the aggressor remained on the team and KSÍ took no action.  Arnarsdóttir additionally claimed that she had been contacted by a lawyer, sent by KSÍ, who offered her a compensation and asked her to sign a confidentiality agreement of the incident.  Following the interview with Arnarsdóttir, Guðni Bergsson resigned as president of KSÍ.  

Following Guðni's resignation, two players were removed from the national neam: Kolbeinn Sigþórsson and Rúnar Már Sigurjónsson. Kolbeinn was coincidently exposed as Arnarsdóttir's perpetrator.

The board of KSÍ intended to continue undisturbed after Guðni's renouncement, claiming that the Association would be unfunctional without them. However, a majority of KSÍ's member societies protested and demanded that the board and the manager resign. A number of KSÍ's major sponsors added to the threat by stating that they would rescind their contracts with the Association unless its leaders seriously improved how reports of sexual abuse were treated.  Within two days of Bergsson's resignement, the entire board of KSÍ, consisting of 14 men and 2 women, had resigned as well.

References

External links

 Iceland at FIFA site
 Iceland at UEFA site

Sports governing bodies in Iceland
Iceland
Football in Iceland
Futsal in Iceland
1947 establishments in Iceland
Sports organizations established in 1947